Autumn Sky is the eighth studio album by the group Blackmore's Night. It is dedicated to their daughter Autumn Esmerelda Blackmore, who was born on May 27, 2010. It was released on September 3, 2010 in Europe and on January 18, 2011 in the U.S.

Autumn Sky entered at #1 on the New Age Billboard Charts. It reached #13 in Greece, #29 in Finland, #36 in Sweden, #43 in Austria and # 57 in Switzerland. In Russia it went gold. The album won a Zone Music Award for the Best Vocal Album.

Track listing

Personnel
 Ritchie Blackmore - guitars, renaissance drum, nyckelharpa, hurdy-gurdy, mandola, mandolin
 Candice Night - vocals, harmonies, penny whistle, gemshorn, rauschpfeife, shawms, bombards, chanters, recorders
 Bard David of Larchmont - keyboards, backing vocals
 Gypsy Rose (Elizabath Cary) - violin, harmony vocals
 Earl Grey of Chimey (Mike Clemente) - bass and rhythm guitar
 Squire Malcolm of Lumley (Malcolm Dick) - percussion and drums
 Albert Danneman - renaissance woodwinds and vocals

Additional personnel (from sleeve)
 Producer: Pat Regan
 Orchestra: Pat Regan's Orchestral Consort
 Mastering: Brad Vance (Red Mastering)

Charts

References

2010 albums
Blackmore's Night albums